Celia Dale (15 January 1912 – 31 December 2011), was an English author and book reviewer.

Family
Both Celia Dale's parents were actors – her father was the noted stage and television actor James Dale (1887–1985), her mother Marguerite Adamson. She was a cousin of the novelist Sarah Harrison. She was married to the journalist and critic Guy Ramsey, until his death in 1959.

Work
Celia Dale's first novel,  The Least Of These, was published in 1943 and she went on to write twelve more and a volume of short stories. Her later novels were psychological thrillers. She won several awards, including the Crime Writers' Association Best Short Story of the Year award for Lines of Communication and A Personal Call and other stories in 1986. She also worked as a secretary to the author Rumer Godden. Four of her novels were reissued as Faber Finds in 2008.

Celia Dale died on 31 December 2011, just a couple of weeks before her 100th birthday.

Bibliography
 The Least of These (1944)
 To Hold the Mirror (1946)
 The Dry Land (1952)
 The Wooden O (1953)
 Trial of Strength (1955)
 A Spring of Love (1960)
 Other People (1964)
 A Helping Hand (1966)
 Act of Love (1969)
 A Dark Corner (1971)
 The Innocent Party (1973)
 Helping with Enquiries (1979, aka The Deception)
 Sheep's Clothing (1988)

References

1912 births
2011 deaths
English crime fiction writers
20th-century English novelists